McCallie is a surname. Notable people with the surname include:

Joanne P. McCallie (born 1966), American women's basketball coach
Marshall Fletcher McCallie (born 1945), former US ambassador to Namibia

See also
The McCallie School, boys' preparatory school in Chattanooga, Tennessee